Yunus Özyavuz (born 17 August 1978), better known by his stage name Sagopa Kajmer, is a Turkish rapper, songwriter, record producer, and DJ. He was born in 1978 in Samsun, and finished his primary and high school there. He then started working as a DJ in one of Samsun's local radio stations. In order to continue his education, he moved to Istanbul and studied Persian language and literature at Istanbul University. In 1998, he founded the hip hop band Kuvvetmira and started his career with his stage name "Silahsız Kuvvet". He featured in the compilation album Yeraltı Operasyonu as Silahsız Kuvvet in 1999. He later changed his stage name to Sagopa Kajmer and released an album with the same name Sagopa Kajmer in 2002. Following the release of the album, he released Bir Pesimistin Gözyaşları in 2004. Same year, he contributed to the soundtrack for the movie G.O.R.A.. He released another studio album Romantizma in 2005 and on 11 August 2005 found his own production company Melankolia Müzik. In 2006, he released the compilation album Kafile under the label Melankolia Müzik. On 1 August 2006, he married fellow rapper Kolera (Esen Güler). In 2007, they released their first mutual album İkimizi Anlatan Bir Şey. He released two more solo albums, Kötü İnsanları Tanıma Senesi (2008) and Şarkı Koleksiyoncusu (2009), before releasing another mutual album with Kolera, Bendeki Sen, in 2010. Since then, he has released four studio albums: Saydam Odalar (2011), Kalp Hastası (2013), Ahmak Islatan (2017) and Kağıt Kesikleri (2022).

Career

1978–2002: Early life and career beginnings
Yunus Özyavuz was born on 17 August 1978 in Samsun. He finished primary and high school in Samsun. In his own words, his interest in music rose after listening to African music by his mother, and Italian music by his father. He started his music career by working as a DJ in one of Samsun's local radio stations. During that period, he used the name Dj Rapper M.C. (Dj Rapper Mic Check). In 1997, he moved to Istanbul to continue his education and studied Persian language and literature at Istanbul University. He graduated 4 years later.

In 1998, he founded the rap group Kuvvetmira. In 1999, he featured in the compilation album Yeraltı Operasyonu as Silahsız Kuvvet. At the same time, he released another album, Gerilim 99 (Promo). In the same month, he released his first EP Pesimist EP 1. In 2000, together with Ceza, he released the album Toplama Kampı. One year later, he released another album Sözlerim Silahım. At the same time period he also released One Second. In 2002, he released the studio album İhtiyar Heyeti, and produced Ceza's album Med Cezir. At the same, he released the album Sagopa Kajmer, which was followed by On Kurşun.

2003–2009: Bir Pesimistin Gözyaşları, Romantizma, İkimizi Anlatan Bir Şey and Kötü İnsanları Tanıma Senesi 
In 2004, he gave an interview to Radikal in which he said that after 7 years of using the stage name Silahsız Kuvvet, he would use the stage name Sagopa Kajmer from now on. In the same year, he produced the album Rapstar and appeared alongside Ceza on the music video for "Neyim Var Ki". In June 2003, his new album, Bir Pesimistin Gözyaşları, was released by Hammer Müzik and turned the songs "Maskeli Balo" and "Karikatür Komedya" from the album into music videos. In 2004, he produced Dr. Fuchs's album Huzur N Darem. Later, he made the music for Cem Yılmaz's comedy film G.O.R.A..

On 19 August 2005, he released the album Romantizma under the label İrem Records and later turned the song "Vasiyet" into a music video. The music video for "Vasiyet" won the Best Video Clip award at the 12th Kral TV Video Music Awards in 2005. In the same year, he released Pesimist EP 3. To produce his own albums and to open doors for new opportunities, on 11 August 2005 Kajmer opened Melankolia Müzik together with Kolera.

Together with other members of Kuvvetmira, Sagopa Kajmer released the album Kafile on 1 January 2006 under the label Melankolia Müzik.

On 26 Apriln 2007, he released his first mutual album with Kolera, İkimizi Anlatan Bir Şey. In 2008, his solo album Kötü İnsanları Tanıma Senesi was released alongside two music videos for the songs "Ben Hüsrana Komşuyum" and "Düşersem Yanarım". On 6 May 2008, he released the single "Bu Şarkıyı Zevk İçin Yaptık", which featured Kolera. On 27 December 2008, he released Pesimist EP 5 - Kör Cerrah on his official website.

In 2009, he released the songs from his previous EPs in a compilation album, titled Şarkı Koleksiyoncusu, on 19 February. On 1 April 2009, he released the single "Beslenme Çantam" as a duet with Kolera. On 18 July 2009, he released another single with Kolera, "Hain".

2010–present: Bendeki Sen, Saydam Odalar and Kalp Hastası
In 2010, he released his second mutual album with Kolera, Bendeki Sen, from which the songs "Bir Dizi İz" and "Merhametine Dön" were turned into music videos. Bendeki Sen was nominated for the Best Album award at the TRT Music Awards, which was based on people's votes. In 2010, he also produced Kafile 2. On 4 February 2010, he released the single "Ardından Bakarım".

In 2011, the album Saydam Odalar was released. "Kaç Kaçabilirsen" and "Bu İşlerden Elini Çek" featured Kolera and a music video was released for "Kaç Kaçabilirsen".

In 2013, he announced on his Twitter account that he was working on a new album. Sagopa Kajmer organized a tour with Pesimist Orchestra during March, April and May 2013 and gave concerts in 15 different cities. On 8 July 2013, his new album Kalp Hastası was released and Kolera was again featured on the song "İster İstemez". One day before the album's release, Sagopa Kajmer released the song "Düşünmek İçin Vaktin Var" on internet together with a music video. This song was later added to Sagopa Kajmer's album Kalp Hastası. Two weeks after the release of the album, a music video was released for the song "Uzun Yollara Devam" as a successor to the clip for "Düşünmek İçin Vaktin Var".

In the early months of 2014, the production process for his new EP Pesimist EP 6 began and it was released on 20 March 2014.
On 6 May 2014, together with Birol Giray (BeeGee), he released the song "Abrakadabra" free of charge on internet. He also composed Cem Adrian's song "Artık Bitti" and served as a backing vocalist on it.

In the early months of 2015, he shared the beats for some of his songs on YouTube and released the beats for his 1998-2001 songs under the name Underground Years on the platform. On 17 June 2015, his new song, "Bilmiyorum", was released on YouTube. On 12 November 2015, his second mutual work with Birol Giray "Naber" was released together with a music video.

In March 2016, it was announced on his official website that he was working on a new song, titled "Tecrübe", together DJ Tarkan. On 31 December 2016, his song "366.Gün" was released on Koleraflow YouTube channel.

In 2017, he released "Ne Kaybederdin" on his official YouTube channel. On 23 August 2017, Sagopa Kajmer announced on his official Twitter account that he was working on a new album and on 1 September 2017 Ahmak Islatan was released. On 31 December 2017, he released a new song "Sorun Var" on his YouTube channel. On 29 May 2018, the music video for the song was released on YouTube. On 25 September 2018, Sagopa Kajmer announced on his Instagram account that his new song would be released on 2 October on digital platforms, and one day prior to that on YouTube. On 1 October 2018, "Oldu Olanlar" was released on YouTube. On his 41st birthday, he released the song "Avutsun Bahaneler". On 29 November 2019, Sagopa Kajmer released the EP Sarkastik. A music video was also released for its lead single "Toz Taneleri". An investigation was started by legal authorities following complaints by the public on the grounds that he encouraged people to smoke by smoking in the music video of the song "Toz Taneleri" published on YouTube. He later gave a statement to the Istanbul Chief Public Prosecutor's Office within the scope of the investigation.

Artistry

Music style
Sagopa Kajmer is a rap music artist. He started his career under the name Silahsız Kuvvet and later used elements of Anatolian melodies and türküs in his songs. Although he initially used curse words in the album Sagopa Kajmer, he later refrained from using them later in his career. He also performed his songs in a tone different than his actual voice to not become famous. His voice is thought to be of Arabesque style. In his 2003 album, Romantizma, there are far more love themes than his previous works.

Influences
Run-DMC's music was influential in forming Kajmer's rap music. He said that he was influenced by the works of Omar Khayyam, Ferdowsi and Rumi. In an interview with Pembe Newspaper, he said: "When I was little I thought I was Jam Master Jay from Run-DMC. LL Cool J and Fat Boys are also very important names. I got my influence from them." The artist's style change and beard gave rise to the rumors that he was influenced by the philosophy of Ahmet Mahmut Ünlü. The artist, however, firmly denied these allegations and said that it was only after reading a hadith that he decided to let his beard grow.

Meaning of Sagopa Kajmer 
Yunus Özyavuz explains the meaning of Sagopa Kajmer with these words:

On Beyazıt Öztürk and Meral Okay's program Nasıl Yani he said:

On 17 November 2015, in response to Mesut Yar's question "What does it mean?" he said:

Personal life 
His mother is Serpil Özyavuz, and his father is Mehmet Özyavuz. He also has a brother named Emre Özyavuz. He is a graduate of Persian language and literature from Istanbul University. On 1 August 2006, he married fellow rapper Esen Güler (known as Kolera). On 20 November 2017, they announced on their Instagram accounts that they had divorced after 11 years of marriage. In May 2018, in response to one of his followers on social media who asked "what is your religious belief" he said "I have no religious beliefs".

Awards and nominations 
In 2005, at Kral TV Video Music Awards, the music video for his song "Vasiyet" was awarded for the best music video. He was also nominated as the Best Turkish Act at the 2008 MTV Europe Music Awards. His mutual album with Kolera Bendeki Sen, was nominated as the best album at TRT Music Awards with the votes of people.

Reception 
Fuat Ergin has said about Sagopa Kajmer: "He's not a rapper. I'm a rapper, Ceza is a rapper but he is not ... He's a branch of Arabesque." Erol Köse described Sagopa Kajmer as a "hidden star". Akşams columnist Çağla Gürsoy said about him: "Sagopa's name appeared as one of the rap geniuses in Turkey from the beginning. I like both his style and his music." For the list of "50 People That Make You Happy", Esquire magazine described Sagopa Kajmer as a person who "brought a new breath to the rap music culture in Turkey."

Discography 
Studio albums

 Yeraltı Operasyonu (1999)
 Gerilim 99 (Promo) (1999)
 Toplama Kampı (2000)
 Sözlerim Silahım (2001)
 İhtiyar Heyeti (2002)
 On Kurşun (2001)
 One Second (2002)
 Sagopa Kajmer (2002)
 Bir Pesimistin Gözyaşları (2004)
 Romantizma (2005)
 İkimizi Anlatan Bir Şey (2007)
 Kötü İnsanları Tanıma Senesi (2008)
 Bendeki Sen (2010)
 Saydam Odalar (2011)
 Kalp Hastası (2013) 
 Kağıt Kesikleri (2022) 

Compilation albums
 Şarkı Koleksiyoncusu (2009)
 Underground Years (2015)
 Ahmak Islatan (2017)
 Tek (2021)

Duet albums
 Kafile (2006)
 İkimizi Anlatan Bir Şey (2007)
 Bendeki Sen (2010)
 Kafile 2 (2010)

EPs

 Pesimist EP 1 (2000)
 Pesimist EP 2 (2002)
 Pesimist EP 3 (2005)
 Disstortion EP (2005)
 Pesimist EP 4 - Kurşun Asker (2006)
 Pesimist EP 5 - Kör Cerrah (2008)
 Saykodelik EP (2009)
 Pesimist EP 6 - Ahmak Islatan (2014)
 Sarkastik (2019)
 Yunus (2020) 

Singles

 "Kırık Çocuk" (2007)
 "Bu Şarkıyı Zevk İçin Yaptık" (2008)
 "Beslenme Çantam" (2009)
 "Hain" (2009)
 "Ardından Bakarım" (2010)
 "Istakoz" (2012)
 "40" (2012)
 "Ultimate" (2012)
 "Düşünmek İçin Vaktin Var" (2013)
 "Abrakadabra" (2014)
 "Bilmiyorum" (2015)
 "Naber" (2015)
 "Tecrübe" (2016)
 "366.Gün" (2016)
 "Ne Kaybederdin" (2017)
 "Sertlik Kanında Var Hayatın" (2017)
 "Sorun Var" (2017)
 "Serbest" (2018)
 "Oldu Olanlar" (2018)
 "Yirmi Dört (Re-Vocal Version)" (2019)
 "Güvensiz İnsanlar" (2019)
 "Avutsun Bahaneler" (2019)
 "Siyah" (ft. Patron) (2020)
 "Bu Sen Değilsin" (ft. Faruk Sabancı) (2020)
 "Onca Şeyin Ardından" (2021)
 "Saldırground" (2021)
 "Kim" (2021)

References

External links 
 

Living people
1978 births
Turkish male singers
Turkish rappers
Turkish DJs
Turkish former Muslims
Turkish songwriters
Turkish composers
Turkish record producers
Turkish pianists
Former Muslims turned agnostics or atheists
Male pianists
21st-century pianists
21st-century male musicians